Terence Patrick Winter (born October 2, 1960) is an American writer and producer of television and film. He is the creator, writer, and executive producer of the HBO television series Boardwalk Empire (2010–2014). Before creating Boardwalk Empire, Winter was a writer and executive producer for the HBO television series The Sopranos, from the show's second to sixth and final season (2000–2007).

In 2013, Winter wrote the screenplay to Martin Scorsese's The Wolf of Wall Street for which he was nominated for an Academy Award for Best Adapted Screenplay. He was also the co-creator, writer and executive producer of another HBO television drama series, Vinyl (2016), which ran for one season. He was the co-showrunner on the Paramount+ crime series Tulsa King with Taylor Sheridan.

Early life and education 

Winter was born in New York City. He grew up in a working-class family in Marine Park, Brooklyn. He studied at the New York University, where he received a bachelor's degree. He went on to study at St. John's University School of Law, and became a member of the bars of New York State and Connecticut. He practiced law for two years in New York City before moving to Los Angeles in 1991 to pursue a screenwriting career. During that time, he also performed as a stand-up comedian. He eventually won a spot in the Warner Bros. Sitcom Writers Workshop, and later joined the writing staff of the Fox series The Great Defender, starring Michael Rispoli, later a Sopranos cast member.

Career

Early work 
Prior to The Sopranos, Winter wrote for the series Sister, Sister, Xena: Warrior Princess, The Cosby Mysteries, Flipper, Diagnosis: Murder, Charlie Grace, DiResta, and The PJs.

2000–2007: The Sopranos 
Winter wrote or co-wrote 25 episodes of The Sopranos. He also directed "Walk Like a Man". In 2001, together with Tim Van Patten, Winter won both the Writers Guild Award and the Edgar Award for his episode "Pine Barrens", directed by Steve Buscemi. In 2004, Winter won two Emmys, one as Executive Producer for The Sopranos for Outstanding Drama Series, and one for Best Writing in a Drama Series for the episode "Long Term Parking". He won another writing Emmy in 2006 for his episode "Members Only". Also in 2006, Winter wrote and directed an episode, "Walk Like a Man", for the show's final season. Winter won his second Writers Guild Award and his fourth Emmy when The Sopranos won Outstanding Drama Series. He won his third Writers Guild Award and the Pen USA award for his episode "The Second Coming", in 2008. The Sopranos also won The Norman Felton Award for Outstanding Producer of Episodic Television Drama in 2005 and 2008.

2010–2014: Boardwalk Empire 
Winter is Boardwalk Empires creator, showrunner and head writer, with fifteen episodes credited to him, including: "Boardwalk Empire", "The Ivory Tower", "A Return to Normalcy", "21", "Two Boats and a Lifeguard", "To the Lost", "Resolution", "The Pony", "Margate Sands", "Acres of Diamonds", "William Wilson", "Farewell Daddy Blues", "The Good Listener", "Cuanto", and "Eldorado".

Winter and Boardwalk Empire won a Writers Guild of America Award for Best Writing in a New Series and he was nominated for Best Writing in a Dramatic Series 2011–2013. Boardwalk Empire won the Golden Globe Award for Best Television Series Drama in 2011 and was nominated in 2012 and 2013. In addition, Steve Buscemi won for Best Actor in a Dramatic Series and Kelly Macdonald was nominated for Best Supporting Actress in a Series, Miniseries or Motion Picture Made for Television. Boardwalk Empire was in The American Film Institute's Top Ten List for TV in 2010 and 2011. The cast of Boardwalk Empire won the Screen Actor's Guild Award for Best Ensemble in a Drama Series, while Steve Buscemi won the Screen Actors Guild Award for Outstanding Performance by a Male Actor in a Drama Series and Martin Scorsese won the Directors Guild Award for Outstanding Directorial Achievement in Dramatic Series. Boardwalk Empire was nominated for the Emmy for Outstanding Drama Series in both 2011 and 2012. In addition, Boardwalk Empire won The Norman Felton Award for Outstanding Producer of Episodic Television Drama in 2012 and was nominated for BAFTA Best International Television in 2011.

2016–present: Vinyl, Tulsa King 
Winter served as the co-creator, writer, executive producer, and showrunner of the HBO period musical drama series Vinyl, which reunited him with Boardwalk Empire actor Bobby Cannavale and director Martin Scorsese. Despite being picked up for a second season, Winter left his position as showrunner after just one season on the show due to "creative differences" in April 2016 and was replaced by executive producer Scott Z. Burns. In June 2016, HBO canceled the series.

Winter was the showrunner of the first season of the 2022 Paramount+ series Tulsa King.

Film 
Winter wrote the screenplay for the 2005 film Get Rich or Die Tryin' and its accompanying video game 50 Cent: Bulletproof. In 2006, he wrote and produced the film Brooklyn Rules, directed by Michael Corrente. In 2014, he received his first Academy Award nomination for Best Adapted Screenplay for The Wolf of Wall Street.

Filmography

Film

Television

References

External links 

 

1960 births
American male screenwriters
American television writers
Television producers from New York City
American television directors
Showrunners
New York University alumni
Edgar Award winners
Writers Guild of America Award winners
Living people
Pine Barrens (New Jersey)
Primetime Emmy Award winners
Writers from Brooklyn
St. John's University School of Law alumni
New York (state) lawyers
Connecticut lawyers
American male television writers
Screenwriters from New York (state)
People from Marine Park, Brooklyn